The Contingencies Fund Act 2021 (2021 c. 9) is an act of the Parliament of the United Kingdom which allowed for a temporary increase in the maximum capital of the United Kingdom's contingency fund from 2%, as set out in Section 1 of the Contingencies Fund Act 1974, to 12%. It was introduced by Chancellor of the Exchequer Rishi Sunak in response to the ongoing effects of the COVID-19 pandemic.

Background
The Contingencies Fund was established in 1862 by HM Treasury, and allows governmental departments to access cash advances when money for urgent matters is likely to achieve parliamentary approval, but is needed quickly. Usually, the Contingencies Fund Act 1974 requires that the permanent capital of the fund not exceed 2% of the authorised supply expenditure of the previous financial year.

Because of the effects of the coronavirus pandemic, the Contingencies Fund Act 2020 increased the fund's limit from 2% to 50% but was due to expire on 1 April 2021; this legislation provides an extension to the fund limit increase.

Passage through Parliament
The bill was introduced in the Commons for its first reading on 9 March 2021. It had its second and third readings on 11 March, and was passed to the Lords for its first reading the same day. The bill passed all its remaining readings on 12 March and was given royal assent on 15 March.

Provisions
The Act's sole provision was a temporary increase to the contingency fund limit set out in the Contingencies Fund Act 1974 from 2% to 12% (increasing the fund from £17.5 billion to £105 billion). The increase automatically expires on 1 April 2022.

References

2021 in British law
United Kingdom Acts of Parliament 2021
COVID-19 pandemic in the United Kingdom
Law associated with the COVID-19 pandemic in the United Kingdom
Economic responses to the COVID-19 pandemic